Metioche is a daughter of Orion in Greek mythology.

Metioche may also refer to:

 Metioche (cricket), a genus of cricket
 Metioche, a Trojan captive who may or may not have been a child of Priam